5N Plus is a Canadian producer of high-purity metals and compounds for electronic applications best known as the major supplier of cadmium telluride (CdTe) to First Solar. The company was founded in 1996 and is headquartered in Saint-Laurent, Quebec, Canada. 5N Plus is a leading producer of specialty metals and chemicals, including high-purity metals such as bismuth, indium, and tellurium, as well as other materials such as cadmium, gallium, and selenium. The company's products are used in a range of applications, including electronics, solar energy, and medical devices. 5N Plus has operations in North America, Europe, and Asia and serves customers around the world.

Overview 
5N Plus draws its name from the purity of its products, 99.999% (five nines or 5N) and more.  It produces tellurium, cadmium, zinc and related compounds of 5N, 6N and 7N purity, as well as selenium, antimony and bismuth of 5N purity. Its products are critical precursors in a number of electronic applications, including the rapidly expanding thin-film photovoltaic market and to the radiation detector market.

5N Plus is an integrated producer with both primary and secondary refining capabilities. 5N Plus' primary refining capabilities are such that it can treat very low-grade metal concentrates, and extract and refine the metals of interest so that they can be fed to its secondary refining operations, where 5N Plus attains a high level of purity.  Its primary refining capabilities also enable it to treat complex feeds and very low-grade concentrates containing only small amounts of the metals of interest, and thus provide its customers with recycling solutions.

It sales have increased from $10.3 million for the fiscal year ended May 31, 2005 to $69.4 million for the fiscal year ended May 31, 2009, representing a compound annual growth rate of 61.1%. During this period, which was characterized by rapid growth and significant expansion of its production capacity, 5N Plus has been able to increase its profitability; its net income grew from $0.9 million to $20.9 million over the same period, representing a CAGR of 119.5%.

References

Companies listed on the Toronto Stock Exchange
Companies based in Montreal
Saint-Laurent, Quebec